Himalayan International School is a co-ed day and boarding school situated in Himachal Pradesh, India, in the village of Chharabra. In 2014, it was rated among the Top ICSE Schools in Shimla.

History
The school building was once the summer palace of Maharaja Kameshwar Singh Bahadur, and is named Kalyani House, in honour of the Maharaja's third wife, Maharani Kam Sundari (Kalyani) Singh. The school was founded by the retired Major General Jagjit Singh, who was also its first Chairman. The first principal of the school was Mrs. Indira Goswami; her successor was Major General Singh's adopted daughter Dr. Sarita Sing, Dr Sarita V. Rao (After marrigar Name), who served from 1981 to 2001. She was also the Deputy Director of the Sardar Kumer Singh Educational Society. After her retirement, her position was taken by Mr. Raja Singh.

Location
The scenic Pir Panjal ranges lie to the east, separated from the school by Mashobra Valley. Also in the vicinity are the Kalyani Helipad, the summer residence of the Governor of Punjab, the Wild Flower Hall, and famous tourist spot Kufri. The highway upon which the school is located boasts of being an international highway leading to Tibet.

Many Bollywood films such as  Lootmaar, Badalte Rishtey, and King Uncle were shot at the School.

Demolition threat
After the death of its founder, Major General Jagjit Singh, the school lost its dignity and went into the hands of a company called Alchemist. Alchemist tried to demolish the school, but parents of the students protested and challenged the company in Shimla High Court. The message spread across social networking sites, and former students came to Shimla to show their support. At this international school, 30% of students were foreign. The Chief Justice ordered the alumni to reform the society and raise funds. Soon a society called "HISSA" was formed and funds began to pour in, with over five hundred thousand rupees raised in a week.

References

Education in Shimla
Schools in Shimla district
Boarding schools in Himachal Pradesh